The Nuts & Bolts of PBM (also known as Nuts & Bolts of Starweb, Nuts & Bolts of Gaming, or NABOG) was a magazine dedicated to play-by-mail games, first published in June 1980 as Nuts and Bolts of Starweb, and edited by Richard J. Buda. The magazine incorporated in 1983 to Bolt Publications. Rick Loomis of Flying Buffalo Games stated in 1985 that the Nuts & Bolts of PBM (first called Nuts & Bolts of Starweb) was the first PBM magazine not published by a PBM company. He stated that "It was a fun magazine, but somewhat ahead of its time, and it had no financial backing." Afterward, the name changed to Nuts & Bolts of Gaming.

Evolution
The editors of Flagship magazine stated that the Nuts & Bolts of Gaming was "the oldest PBM magazine". The magazine started in mid-1980 in Chicago, IL, as the Nuts & Bolts of Starweb. According to Rick Buda, the initial issues were a fanzine for Starweb and were made of a "Xeroxed copied sheet folded in half …  that made four, crude pages". Buda explains how the publication was named as follows:  I was enamored with The Berserker character [from Starweb], and really [started] the zine to discuss strategies for playing that part to the hilt. That is actually the source of the name, twofold in its reference. One – The robotic image of machinery (Nuts & Bolts), and; Two – Getting down to particulars within the characters (get down to the nuts and bolts of something). 

Buda stated that, after demand increased, he and Rick Loomis increased the size of the publication, changed the publication rate to bi-monthly, and renamed it to the Nuts & Bolts of PBM. In 1983, the magazine incorporated. Buda incorporated it as Bolt Publications after the load became unmanageable, changing the name once again to Nuts & Bolts of Gaming. This was shortened to NABOG, which was also their mascot's nickname. The magazine's print run, which started with a small number, rose to 600–700 in the first year, and peaked eventually at 3,000, including international readers.

In 1984, Bob McLain from Gaming Universal offered to acquire the publication, but Gaming Universal ceased publication before the deal went through, after a run of three issues. As the publication had been preparing for the transition versus the next issue, it then "collapsed". By 1985, the magazine had ceased publication. A commentator in the Summer 1985 issue of Flagship noted that the magazine had recently closed, while also noting that Rick Buda had been elected to the Play-By-Mail Association's (PBMA's) Membership Committee with Paper Mayhem's David Webber as well as Jon Clemens, Mike Shefler, and Jack Everitt.

Contents
The Nuts & Bolts of PBM was a review, tactics, and news magazine about play-by-mail games. Issues contained an editorial by Rick Buda, artwork, fiction, and content on games. The topics evolved from purely focused on the game Starweb at the outset, to PBM games, and eventually to all game genres.

Reception
W.G. Armintrout reviewed The Nuts & Bolts of PBM in The Space Gamer No. 48. Armintrout commented that "This magazine is a disappointment. Nuts & Bolts needs contributors who have something to say and know how to say it. I can't recommend this magazine until it shapes up." By the fifth year, the magazine's quality had greatly improved. It was nominated for an Origins Award but did not win due to closing before the final voting.

See also
 List of play-by-mail games

References

Bibliography
 
 
 
 
 
 

Bimonthly magazines published in the United States
Defunct magazines published in the United States
Magazines established in 1980
Magazines disestablished in 1984
Play-by-mail magazines